Suffer little children to come unto me or Let the Little Children Come to Me, is a painting attributed to the Dutch painter Rembrandt. The subject of the portrait is the teaching of Jesus about little children and it is estimated that Rembrandt painted it in Leiden in the 1620s.

History
The painting was rediscovered by Dutch art dealer Jan Six in 2016. He is a direct descendant of Jan Six, a 17th-century burgher who sat for one of Rembrandt’s most important paintings, Portrait of Jan Six. The painting is dated to the 1620s and grouped under the growing list of paintings in Rembrandt's oeuvre known as his "juvenalia". It was kept secret pending investigation and restoration and was meant to be announced and introduced to the public at the opening of a Rembrandt exhibition at the Museum De Lakenhal in Leiden, scheduled to open 1 November 2019, but rumors prevented insiders from keeping it secret. Six asked an investor to buy it at Lempertz auction for €1,525,000.

The painting had previously been known and rejected by experts, though all were in agreement as to the large amount of overpainting and it was during removal of this overpaint that convincing details were revealed such as the color purple used for clothing. The subject and arrangement of figures was inspired by a 1619 work by Pieter Lastman (formerly in Frederiksborg, lost in 1859 fire) and later formed the inspiration for another work previously attributed to Rembrandt and now listed as circa 1652 by his pupil Nicolaes Maes: 

The painting includes a self portrait of the young Rembrandt, a portrait of his mother, and other motifs known through his history paintings:

Other history paintings by Rembrandt from the 1620s also show a man in shadow wearing a turban in profile:

See also
 Lost artworks

References

External links
 Lot 1174, 17 May 2014, Lempertz

Suffer
1620s paintings
Religious paintings
Paintings of children
Paintings depicting Jesus